Separate But Equal is a 1991 American two-part television miniseries depicting the landmark Supreme Court desegregation case Brown v. Board of Education, based on the phrase "Separate but equal". The film stars Sidney Poitier as lead NAACP attorney Thurgood Marshall, Richard Kiley as Chief Justice Earl Warren, Burt Lancaster (in his final television role) as lawyer John W. Davis (loser of Briggs v. Elliott and the Democratic candidate in the 1924 US presidential election), Cleavon Little as lawyer and judge Robert L. Carter, and Lynne Thigpen as Ruth Alice Stovall.

In 1991, the Academy of Television Arts and Sciences rewarded the film Outstanding Miniseries award. The film received 8 nominations for Emmy Awards in 1991 and won 2, and received 2 nominations for Golden Globe Awards in 1992.

Plot
The issue before the United States Supreme Court is whether the equal protection clause of the 14th Amendment of the U.S. Constitution mandates the individual states to desegregate public schools; that is, whether the nation's "separate but equal" policy heretofore upheld under the law, is unconstitutional.  The issue is placed before the Court by Brown v. Board of Education and its companion case, Briggs v. Elliott.  Many of the justices personally believe segregation is morally unacceptable, but have difficulty justifying the idea legally under the 14th Amendment.  Marshall and Davis argue their respective cases.  Marshall argues the equal protection clause extends far enough to the states to prohibit segregated schools.  Davis counters that control of public schools is a "states' rights" issue that Congress never intended to be covered by the 14th Amendment when it was passed.

Taking the case under advisement, the stalemated justices agree to allow Marshall and Davis an opportunity to reargue their respective cases as to whether the equal protection clause specifically extends to the desegregation of schools.  In the interim, Chief Justice Fred M. Vinson dies and is replaced by a non-jurist, Governor Earl Warren of California.

Meanwhile, Marshall and his staff are fruitless in finding any research showing the Civil-War era crafters of the 14th Amendment in 1866 intended for schools to be desegregated.  On the other hand, Davis and his Ivy League-educated staff find several examples of segregated schools having existed ever since the passage of the equal protection clause.  Finally, the NAACP staffers discover a quote by Thaddeus Stevens delivered on the floor of the Senate during the debate over the Amendment, which directly states segregation is constitutionally and morally wrong.  They place it at the front of their brief.  Marshall's argument is compelling.

As the case is taken under advisement a second time, new Chief Justice Warren is taken on a tour of Gettysburg by his black chauffeur.  He also realizes that his chauffeur must sleep in the car because there are no lodging places available for him because of his race. Warren discovers a majority of the Court agrees to strike down the "separate but equal" laws; however, it is important to him that the Court be unanimous.  He writes an opinion and takes copies to all of the dissenting justices trying to convince each one of the significance of unanimity.  They finally all agree.  Warren reads his opinion which states that segregation "has no place" in American society.  Even opposing counsel, John W. Davis, privately agrees it is time for society to change.

The epilogue acknowledges Thurgood Marshall's own ascent to the Supreme Court in 1967 and explains that the plaintiff in the companion case, a black student named Briggs, never attended an integrated school.

Cast

See also
 Civil rights movement in popular culture
 Supreme Court of the United States in fiction

References

External links
 

1990s American television miniseries
American biographical series
Civil rights movement in television
American courtroom films
Primetime Emmy Award for Outstanding Miniseries winners
Primetime Emmy Award-winning television series
1991 television films
1991 films
Television courtroom dramas
1990s American films